Win Case (born July 15, 1963) is an American basketball coach and former player. He was most recently the interim head coach of the Ole Miss Rebels men's basketball team between the firing of Kermit Davis and hiring of Chris Beard. He served as an assistant for Kermit Davis prior to his firing on February 24, 2023.

Head coaching record

References 

1963 births
Living people
Basketball coaches from Oklahoma
Middle Tennessee Blue Raiders men's basketball coaches
Oklahoma Baptist Bison basketball coaches
Oklahoma City Stars men's basketball coaches
Oklahoma State Cowboys basketball players
Ole Miss Rebels men's basketball coaches
Seminole State Trojans men's basketball players
Sportspeople from Tulsa, Oklahoma
University of Science and Arts of Oklahoma alumni